The Crossroads Guitar Festival is a series of music festivals and benefit concerts founded by Eric Clapton. The festivals benefit the Crossroads Centre founded by Eric Clapton, a drug treatment center in Antigua. The concerts showcase a variety of guitarists, selected by Eric Clapton personally. To the 2007 audience, Clapton declared that each performer was one of the very best, and had earned his personal respect.

The first concert was held on June 30, 1999, at Madison Square Garden in New York City, and there again in 2013. The 2004 concert was held at the Cotton Bowl in Dallas, while the 2007 and 2010 festivals were held at Toyota Park, Bridgeview, Illinois, just outside Chicago. The festival returned to Dallas in 2019 at the American Airlines Center.

1999 festival
The first Crossroads Benefit concert was held at Madison Square Garden, New York on June 30, 1999. It was held under a different title which was Eric Clapton & Friends In Concert: A Benefit For The Crossroads Centre At Antigua. The first official Crossroads Guitar Festival did not happen until 2004.

Performers 
Some performers at the 1999 Concert were David Sanborn, Sheryl Crow, Bob Dylan and Mary J Blige. Backup musicians included Nathan East (bass), Steve Gadd (drums) Andy Fairweather Low (guitars), Tim Carmon (keyboards) and Dave Delhomme (keyboards). Back-up vocals were by Tessa Niles and Katie Kissoon.

2004 festival
Held at Cotton Bowl stadium in Dallas, Texas, from June 4, 2004, to June 6, 2004. A two-disc DVD containing 250 minutes of footage of the 2004 concert was released in the same year. This became the first official Crossroads Guitar Festival even though the 1999 concert had a different title. It was also the first benefit concert under the Crossroads Guitar Festival name.

Performers
Some performers at the Crossroads Guitar Festival such as Jeff Beck, Pat Metheny, Neal Schon, and Styx were not included on the DVD.

 Eric Clapton
 Johnny A.
 Vishwa Mohan Bhatt
 Ron Block
 Joe Bonamassa
 Booker T. & the M.G.'s
 Doyle Bramhall II
 JJ Cale
 Larry Carlton
 Robert Cray
 Steve Cropper
 Sheryl Crow
 Bo Diddley
 Jerry Douglas
 David Honeyboy Edwards
 Rocky Frisco
 Vince Gill
 Buddy Guy
 David Hidalgo
 Zakir Hussain
 Eric Johnson
 B.B. King
 Sonny Landreth
 Jonny Lang
 Robert Lockwood, Jr.
 John Mayer
 John McLaughlin
 Robert Randolph
 Duke Robillard
 Carlos Santana
 Hubert Sumlin
 James Taylor
 Susan Tedeschi
 Derek Trucks
 Dan Tyminski
 Steve Vai
 Jimmie Vaughan
 Joe Walsh
 ZZ Top
 David Johansen

2007 festival
The 2007 Crossroads Guitar Festival was held at Toyota Park in Bridgeview, Illinois on July 28, 2007. Tickets were estimated as sold out for the 28,000 capacity park in twenty two minutes. A DVD of the concert was released on November 20, 2007.

Performers
Eric Clapton played alongside various performers, and there were many one-off collaborations during the show. In order of appearance, the performers on the main stage were 
 

 Bill Murray
 Sonny Landreth
 John McLaughlin
 Alison Krauss and Union Station featuring Jerry Douglas
 Doyle Bramhall II
 The Derek Trucks Band
 joined by Susan Tedeschi and Johnny Winter
 Robert Randolph and the Family Band
 The Robert Cray Band
 joined by Jimmie Vaughan, Hubert Sumlin, and B. B. King
 Aaron Loesch (winner of Guitar Center's 2007 King of the Blues contest)

 John Mayer
 Vince Gill
 joined by Albert Lee, Sheryl Crow, Peter Stroud and Willie Nelson
 Los Lobos
 Jeff Beck with Tal Wilkenfeld, Vinnie Colaiuta, and Jason Rebello
 Eric Clapton
 joined by Robbie Robertson and Steve Winwood
 Buddy Guy
 Finale featuring Buddy Guy with Eric Clapton, Robert Cray, John Mayer, Hubert Sumlin, Johnny Winter, and Jimmie Vaughan

On the second stage at the Festival Village, performers included:

 Orianthi
 Harvey Mandel
 Jedd Hughes
 Pete Huttlinger

 Tab Benoit and Louisiana's LeRoux
 Jeff Baxter
 Todd Wolfe
 Tyler Bryant
 Flophouse

2010 festival
The 2010 Crossroads festival was again held at Toyota Park in Bridgeview, IL (outside Chicago) on June 26, 2010.

Performers
In order of appearance. Artists in bold have received star billing in advertisements. Comedian Bill Murray MC-ed. 
 

 Kirby Kelley (winner of Guitar Center's 2009 King of the Blues contest)
 Sonny Landreth^*
 Robert Randolph and the Family Band^* joined by Joe Bonamassa and Pino Daniele
 The Robert Cray Band^* with Jimmie Vaughan^* and Hubert Sumlin^*
 Bert Jansch
 Stefan Grossman joined by Keb' Mo'
 ZZ Top^
 Doyle Bramhall II^* and Faded Boogie joined by Gary Clark, Jr. and Sheryl Crow^* and Derek Trucks* and Susan Tedeschi*
 Vince Gill^* joined by Albert Lee*, James Burton^, and Keb' Mo'

 Citizen Cope joined by Sheryl Crow
 Earl Klugh with Yonrico Scott and Joseph Patrick Moore
 John Mayer Trio^*
 Buddy Guy^* with Jonny Lang^ and Ronnie Wood
 The Derek Trucks* and Susan Tedeschi* Band joined by Warren Haynes, Sheryl Crow, David Hidalgo^*, Cesar Rosas*, and Johnny Winter* (This set replaced the originally scheduled Allman Brothers Band.)
 Jeff Beck^* with Rhonda Smith, Narada Michael Walden, and Jason Rebello*
 Eric Clapton^* with Steve Winwood* joined by Citizen Cope and Jeff Beck
 B.B. King^* with The Robert Cray Band, Jimmie Vaughan and Eric Clapton
 Finale set with many artists returning for a performance of "Sweet Home Chicago"

^ - artists who also performed at the 2004 festival. * - artists who also performed at the 2007 festival.

2013 festival
The 2013 festival was held April 12–13 at Madison Square Garden in New York City.

Performers
Performers included:

 Albert Lee
 Alice Smith
 Allan Holdsworth
 Allman Brothers Band
 Andy Fairweather Low
 B.B. King
 Beth Hart
 Blake Mills
 Booker T
 Buddy Guy
 Citizen Cope
 Dave Biller
 Derek Trucks
 Doyle Bramhall II
 Earl Klugh
 Eric Clapton 
 Gary Clark Jr.
 Jeff Beck

 Jimmie Vaughan
 John Mayer
 John Scofield
 Keb' Mo'
 Keith Richards
 Keith Urban
 Kurt Rosenwinkel
 Los Lobos
 Matt Murphy
 Paul Carrack
 Quinn Sullivan
 Robbie Robertson
 Robert Cray
 Robert Randolph
 Sonny Landreth
 Steve Cropper
 Taj Mahal
 Vince Gill

2019 festival
The 2019 festival was held on September 20–21 at the American Airlines Center in Dallas, Texas.

MC: Bill Murray

Performers
Performers included:

 Alan Darby
 Albert Lee
 Andy Fairweather Low
 Artur Menezes
 Billy Gibbons
 Bonnie Raitt
 Bradley Walker
 Buddy Guy Band
 Daniel Santiago
 Derek Trucks
 Doyle Bramhall II
 Eric Clapton 
 Gary Clark Jr.
 Gustavo Santaolalla
 James Bay
 Jeff Beck
 Jerry Douglas

 Jimmie Vaughan
 Joe Walsh
 John Mayer
 Jonny Lang
 Keb' Mo'
 Kurt Rosenwinkel
 Lianne La Havas
 Los Lobos
 Pedro Martins
 Peter Frampton
 Robert Cray
 Robert Randolph
 Sheryl Crow
 Sonny Landreth
 Susan Tedeschi
 Tom Misch
 Vince Gill
 Citizen Cope
 The Marcus King Band

Outdoor Venue:
Among the Village Stage performers will be surprise main stage artists, along with special guest guitarists such as Eric Johnson, Joe Robinson, Andy Timmons, Paul Reed Smith, Boscoe France, Bryan Ewald, Ryan McGarvey and Peterson Brothers, with others. In addition, next-gen guitarists Jacob Reese Thorton and Brotherhood of the Guitar, the Ernie Ball Play Crossroads national contest winner, and Gibson’s G3 trio will make their Crossroads debut on the Village stage.

References

External links

 Crossroadsguitarfestival.org was the official site for the Crossroads Guitar Festival. It now redirects to ericclapton.com
 Official site for 2007 concert (archived)
 IMDb site for the 2007 festival
 2007 set list (archived)
 Review of 2007 Crossroad Guitar Festival
 Review of DVD for 2007 Crossroads Guitar Festival with set list.

Benefit concerts in the United States
Rock festivals in the United States
Blues festivals in the United States
Folk festivals in the United States
Music festivals in New York City
Music festivals established in 1999
Music festivals in Texas
Music festivals in Illinois